Giovanni Michele Saraceni  (1 December 1498 – 27 April 1568) was a Cardinal of the Roman Catholic Church.

Biography
Saraceni was born in Naples and was a relative of Cardinal Fabio Mignatelli.

He was the archbishop of Acerenza and Matera from 1536. On 23 Mar 1536, he was consecrated bishop by Antonio Sanseverino, Archbishop of Taranto, with Lorenzo Santarelli, Bishop of Pult, and Giacomo Ponzetti, Bishop of Molfetta, serving as co-consecrators. He was made cardinal on 20 November 1551 by Pope Julius III.

He took part in revising the acts of the Council of Trent, and in other Papal missions, including investigating the charges against Cardinal Carlo Cafara.

Cardinal Saraceni died in Rome in 1568.

Episcopal succession

Sources

External links and additional sources
 (for Chronology of Bishops) 
 (for Chronology of Bishops 

16th-century Italian cardinals
Roman Catholic archbishops in Italy
Bishops in Basilicata
1498 births
1583 deaths
16th-century Neapolitan people
16th-century Italian Roman Catholic archbishops